Melanie Amann (born 1978) is a journalist and lawyer. She is co-editor-in-chief of leading Germany weekly Der Spiegel and heads the publication's Berlin office.

Melanie Amann was born in Bonn and raised in Siegburg. She studied law at the University of Trier,  Aix-Marseille III and at Humboldt University of Berlin. After graduating in law (Erstes juristisches Staatsexamen), Amann studied journalism at Deutsche Journalistenschule in Munich. She worked for Bonner General-Anzeiger and Süddeutsche Zeitung. Amann wrote as editor for Financial Times Deutschland mainly about issues in the middle east. In 2006, she joined Frankfurter Allgemeinen Zeitung and wrote mainly on issues concerning employment law.

In 2011, she received a Ph.D. in law from Ludwig-Maximilians-Universität München for a dissertation on the law of union elections.

She joined Der Spiegel in 2013, covering center-right party CDU/CSU and the then-rising right-wing populist Alternative for Germany (AfD). In 2019, she became head of the Berlin office. In May 2021, the magazine announced that Amann and Thorsten Dörting would join then-current editor-in-chief Clemens Höges to form an editorial triumvirate. 

Amann is a regular guest on political talkshows such as Markus Lanz or Anne Will, and appears in English-language shows such as NPR's All Things Considered in the United States.

Published books 
 Die Belegschaftsabstimmung. Schriften zum Arbeitsrecht und Wirtschaftsrecht, Band 73. Peter Lang, Frankfurt am Main u. a. 2012, .
 Angst für Deutschland. Die Wahrheit über die AfD: Wo sie herkommt, wer sie führt, wohin sie steuert. (Fear for Germany. The truth about the AfD: where they come from, who leads it, where it heads.) Droemer, München 2018, .

References 

1978 births
Living people
German journalists
21st-century German lawyers
University of Trier alumni
Der Spiegel people